Holcombe Brook railway station was the terminus of the Bury to Holcombe Brook Line in England and served the village of Holcombe Brook in the Metropolitan Borough of Bury.

History
The Bury and Tottington District Railway opened on 6 November 1882. The northern terminus of the line was at Holcombe Brook,  from Bury.

The station closed when passenger services were withdrawn from the line on 5 May 1952; goods trains continued to serve Holcombe Brook until 2 May 1960. The station was demolished and the site is now occupied by a shopping development.

References

Lost Railways of Lancashire by Gordon Suggitt

External links
Holcombe Brook station on a 1948 OS Map

Disused railway stations in the Metropolitan Borough of Bury
Former Lancashire and Yorkshire Railway stations
Railway stations in Great Britain opened in 1882
Railway stations in Great Britain closed in 1952
Ramsbottom